Mathole Serofo Motshekga (born 2 April 1949) is a South African lawyer and politician who was elected to his third consecutive term as a Member of Parliament in the 2019 general election. He formerly represented his political party, the African National Congress (ANC), as the second Premier of Gauteng. 

Born in what is now Limpopo province, Motshekga was an Advocate of the Supreme Court of South Africa during apartheid and also taught law at the University of South Africa. In September 1997, he was elected Provincial Chairperson of the ANC in Gauteng; he succeeded Tokyo Sexwale as Premier in January 1998. However, after the 1999 general election, newly elected President Thabo Mbeki asked Motshekga to resign as Premier. In subsequent years Motshekga served as a Member of the Gauteng Provincial Legislature and was Chief Whip of the Majority Party in the National Assembly from 2009 until 2013, when he was demoted to an ordinary seat in Parliament. He was also elected to the National Executive Committee of the ANC in 2007 and 2017.

Early life 
Motshekga was born on 2 April 1949 in Modjadjiskloof in what later became South Africa's Limpopo province. His father was a ranger on a white-owned farm, and he had younger siblings. He matriculated in 1969 and after graduation worked as a clerk at the University of the North.

Early career and education 
Motshekga studied law at university, earning a BJuris from the University of South Africa (Unisa) in 1975, and in 1976 he moved to Pretoria to complete his articles for qualification as an attorney. He received an LLB from Unisa in 1978 and enrolled to complete a Doctor of Law at the same university. In 1979, he received a scholarship to conduct his doctoral research in Germany, where he conducted solidarity work for the African National Congress (ANC), attempting to mobilise international support for the anti-apartheid cause. He did similar work while visiting the United States the following year.

Upon his return to South Africa, Motshekga was appointed a senior lecturer at Unisa, where he worked from 1984 to 1994. In 1984, he was admitted as an Advocate of the Supreme Court of South Africa. He ultimately obtained both his Doctorate of Law, from Unisa, and an LLM from Harvard Law School. He also maintained his contacts inside the ANC, which in the 1980s was based in Lusaka, Zambia. When the ANC was unbanned by the apartheid government in 1990, Motshekga was appointed to the interim leadership corps of the ANC in the PWV region around Pretoria, then headed by Tokyo Sexwale.

Provincial political career

ANC Provincial Chairperson: 1997–2000 
At the time of South Africa's first post-apartheid election in 1994, Motshekga was Deputy Provincial Chairperson of the ANC branch in the country's new Gauteng province. He held that position until September 1997, when ANC Provincial Chairperson Tokyo Sexwale resigned and Motshekga was elected to succeed him. His election followed a heated succession battle with multiple rounds of voting: Motshekga defeated Amos Masondo and then, in the final round of voting, beat Frank Chikane with 343 votes to Chikane's 179.

Premier of Gauteng: 1998–1999 
Motshekga likewise succeeded Sexwale as Premier of Gauteng in January 1998 when Sexwale vacated that post. During his tenure, he was subject to an internal investigation by the ANC. President Thabo Mbeki asked him to resign as Premier in April 1999, shortly after Mbeki took office in a general election. Motshekga's ousting from the government office led to division inside the provincial ANC, and the Motshekga-led ANC Provincial Executive Committee was disbanded by the national party leadership in 2000, prematurely ending Motshekga's term as ANC Provincial Chairperson.

In subsequent years, Motshekga expanded his business interests. As of 2006, he was a Member of the Gauteng Provincial Legislature. At one time he represented the ANC on the Judicial Service Commission.

National political career 
At the ANC's 52nd National Conference in December 2007, Motshekga was elected to a five-year term on the ANC National Executive Committee (NEC), the party's top executive organ; by number of votes received, he ranked 53rd of the 80 candidates elected.

ANC Chief Whip: 2009–2013 
In the 2009 general election, Motshekga was elected as a Member of the National Assembly (NA), the lower house of the South African Parliament; at the same time, he was appointed Chief Whip of the ANC, the majority party, in the NA. He served in that position until June 2013, becoming the party's longest-serving Chief Whip.

However, Motshekga was removed as Chief Whip before the end of his term because, at the ANC's next national conference in December 2012, he narrowly failed to gain re-election to the ANC NEC. The NEC said this situation was incongruent with a party resolution adopted in 2008 which required the Chief Whip to sit on the NEC. The ANC therefore removed Motshekga as Chief Whip on 20 June 2013, replacing him with Stone Sizani.

Legislator: 2013–2022 
At a later date, after his removal as Chief Whip, Motshekga was in any case co-opted onto the ANC NEC. At the party's 54th National Conference in December 2017, he was democratically elected to another five-year term on the body, although he was not nominated to stand for re-election at the 55th National Conference in December 2022. 

Simultaneously, Motshekga remained an ordinary Member of Parliament, and he was re-elected to his seat in 2014 and 2019. In addition, in 2014 he was appointed to represent the ANC as an NA delegate to the Judicial Service Commission. He served on a number of parliamentary committees, including as Chairperson of the Portfolio Committee on Justice and Correctional Services (from June 2014 to August 2018) and Chairperson of the Joint Standing Committee on the Financial Management of Parliament (from August 2018 to May 2019). He publicly criticised President Jacob Zuma towards the end of Zuma's presidential term, and he was subsequently viewed as a supporter of Zuma's successor, President Cyril Ramaphosa.

Balobedu royal family 
By the time of the inauguration of Makobo Modjadji VI as Rain Queen in 2003, Motshekga was an adviser to the royal family of Limpopo's Balobedu people. After Makobo Modjadji died in 2005, Motshekga raised her only daughter, Princess Masalanabo Modjadji, who at the time of the queen's death was still an infant. This led to a custody battle and ultimately to a rift with the royal family: in 2019, the family accused Motshekga of attempting to turn the princess against them and "hijack" the throne. In 2022, Motshekga took the family to court in a bid to challenge the coronation of Masalanabo's brother, Prince Lukukela, as Balobedu monarch; he claimed that Masalanabo was the rightful heir to the throne.

Personal life
Motshekga believes in a religion which he calls Karaism and describes as an indigenous African religion. He is married to Minister of Basic Education Angie Motshekga, with whom he has a son, Kabelo, and grandchildren.

References

External link 

 

1949 births
Living people
People from Limpopo
Northern Sotho people
African National Congress politicians
Premiers of Gauteng
Members of the National Assembly of South Africa
20th-century South African lawyers
21st-century South African lawyers
University of South Africa alumni
Harvard Law School alumni